The Oberheim Two-Voice Pro is an analog music synthesizer that was produced from 2015-2018 under the Tom Oberheim brand. It is an updated version of the original Oberheim Two-Voice, which was produced from 1975-1979.

This instrument was designed around coupling two SEM (Synthesizer Expander Module) modules. Each voice is individually programmed and has its own multiband filter. The modern Pro version contains a digital sequencer, MIDI, and a comprehensive patch panel to allow the instrument to interface with modular setups.

In March 2021, Tom Oberheim released a "Special Edition" version of the Two-Voice Pro in limited numbers. This was the first instrument designed by Tom Oberheim released under the Oberheim brand name since 1985; the Oberheim brand had been returned to him by Gibson in 2019.

Notable users
 Vince Clarke
 Vangelis
 J3PO
 Kaitlyn Aurelia Smith

See also
 Polyphonic synthesizer

References

External links

Two-Voice Pro
Analog synthesizers
Polyphonic synthesizers